Surjit Memorial Hockey Tournament is organized by Surjit Hockey Society every year in Jalandhar, Punjab. It is for the memorial of Surjit Singh.

Venue
The matches are held at Surjit Hockey Stadium.

Teams
The teams which participates in the tournament consists of public sector teams from across the country, such as:

 Indian Oil, Mumbai
 Army-XI, Delhi
 Corps of Signal, Jalandhar
 ONGC, Delhi
 Punjab National Bank, Delhi
 Bharat Petroleum, Mumbai
 BSF, Jalandhar
 Namdhari-XI, Sirsa
 Punjab Police, Jalandhar
 Punjab & Sind Bank, Jalandhar
 RCF, Kapurthala
 Northern Railways, Delhi
 CRPF, Delhi

Results
The results of the Surjit Memorial Hockey Tournament:

References

External links
Official Website

Field hockey cup competitions in India
Sport in Jalandhar
Field hockey in Punjab, India
Recurring sporting events established in 1984